The following is a list of UMass Minutemen football seasons.

Seasons

References

 
UMass
UMass Minutemen football seasons